Bienvenida is a Spanish municipality in the province of Badajoz, Extremadura. It has a population of 2,343  (2007) and an area of 92.2 km².

It is the Spanish town that is a member of the Charter of European Rural Communities, a town twinning association across the European Union.

This was also the town where, until his death in 2018, the oldest man in Spain and the World lived. His name was Francisco Núñez Olivera and lived 113 years (1904-2018).

References

Municipalities in the Province of Badajoz